Loreto-di-Casinca is a commune in the Haute-Corse department of France on the island of Corsica. The Église Saint-André de Loreto-di-Casinca is a historical monument.

Population

See also
Communes of the Haute-Corse department

References

Communes of Haute-Corse
Haute-Corse communes articles needing translation from French Wikipedia